Tai Chao-chih (born 13 March 1930) is a Taiwanese former sports shooter. He competed at the 1964 Summer Olympics and the 1968 Summer Olympics. He also competed at the 1966 Asian Games and won a bronze medal in the team event.

References

External links
 
 Photo of Tai at the 1964 Olympics, from the Central News Agency (Taiwan)

1930 births
Possibly living people
Taiwanese male sport shooters
Olympic shooters of Taiwan
Shooters at the 1964 Summer Olympics
Shooters at the 1968 Summer Olympics
Asian Games medalists in shooting
Shooters at the 1966 Asian Games
Asian Games bronze medalists for Chinese Taipei
Medalists at the 1966 Asian Games
20th-century Taiwanese people